Pollution in the Arctic Ocean is primarily the result of economic activities carried out on land, which is sources from locally, regionally, and globally origins. There is also the inclusion of industrial development in the Arctic region, northern rivers, and the effects of military activities, particularly nuclear activity – as well as the influx of pollutants from other regions of the world.However, the Arctic Ocean remains relatively clean compared to other marine regions of the world.

Common contaminants found in the Arctic region can include heavy metals and persistent organic pollutants (POPs) which subsequently accumulate in the food chain.  These contaminants come from wastewater as well as long-range pollution both based in the atmosphere and from oceanic movement. Commercial fisheries as well as chemical and waste emissions from resource exploitation including mining, minerals, oil and gas extraction are among the many pollutants. Moreover, there are approximately 8.3 Billion metric tons of plastic in the Arctic ocean ( dated 2017 ) and an expected 34 billion metric tons in 2050.

Economic activity in the Arctic seas is not the only source of pollution. The growing presence of military weapons systems in the region raises concerns of increased pollution. Management of specific risks of marine pollution in the Arctic is governed primarily by national legislation in coastal states, although these take existing international standards into account. Bilateral agreements exist between Arctic states on cooperation in the prevention of marine pollution in the Arctic seas and immediate responses in case of oil spills. Nevertheless, there is no legal framework relating to weapons and other military presence.

The first steps in this direction have already been made. After signing the 2010 Treaty on Maritime Delimitation of the continental shelf in the Barents Sea and the Arctic Ocean, Russia and Norway began bilateral consultations on the harmonization of national environmental standards used for the exploration and development of the mineral resources of the shelf. The parties came to an agreement to make a comparative analysis of national legislation and to identify differences concerning measures for preventing the pollution of the environment.

A recent report published by the International Council on Clean Transportation (ICCT) suggested that the reduction of the polar ice caps and the projected increase in shipping activity in the region
could have a severe impact on the levels of pollution experienced across the entire Arctic region but notes that a shift to cleaner sulphur-based fuel could resolve the issue.

Economic activities
Russia operates a fleet of nuclear-powered icebreakers to open up shipping lanes in the Arctic Ocean year round. The operation of these vessels is contributing to radioactive contamination of the Arctic environment.

The Yamal Megaproject, a natural gas project developed by the Russian oil and gas company, Gazprom, is a development designed to exploit the largest gas reserves on Earth. Gas spills and climate change effect the indigenous Nentsy population, as the permafrost and water supplies are contaminated.

Military activities
Military activities in the Arctic Ocean have increased substantially. The United States Navy performs an exercise called ICEX where the US Navy practices arctic operations. This increased activity naturally disturbed the original environment that once existed.

Initiatives 
In 1996, the Arctic Council was founded to combat conflict and promote cooperation amongst the Arctic States, which encompasses the indigenous peoples and other inhabitants. Their initiative encourages sustainable development and protection against pollution.

See also 
Global distillation

References

Arctic Ocean
Arctic research
Pollution